Lieutenant-General Wajid Ali Khan Burki (28 October 1900 – 17 January 1989) CBE, was a high-profile Pakistani military official who served as Minister-in-Charge of the Ministry of Health under the military government of Field Marshal Ayub Khan.

Early life and education
Wajid Ali Burki was born in Basti Baba Khel, Jalandhar, Punjab, British India on 28 October 1900, in a Punjabi-speaking Pashtun family. His father Jehan Khan Burki was a landowner there. He received his early and basic education in Jalandhar and then came to the UK to study medicine at the University of St. Andrews. He also started working as junior clinical assistant at the Royal London Ophthalmic Hospital. Burki received his MD degree in 1926. In 1927, he joined the Indian Medical Service and worked in military hospitals at Jalandhar, Quetta and Karachi. He then returned to the UK for further studies in medicine and received his DOMS degree in 1932. He was then appointed as an eye specialist at Meerut, British India.

Burki married Iqbal Khanum in 1935 and they had three sons and two daughters in this marriage.

Military and civil career
After the independence of Pakistan in 1947, he chose to live in Pakistan and became the first deputy director of the Army Medical Corps (Pakistan). He was promoted to major general in 1952. In 1953, he was promoted to lieutenant general and appointed director-general of the Armed Forces Medical Services.

Burki was one of the leading active-duty military official who played an influential role in advising and formulating the health reforms and policies of the Ayub Khan Military administration. General Burki was Ayub Khan's right-hand man, and was instrumental in Ayub Khan's rise to power.

Until today the three families (Ayub, Burki and Nawab of Kalabagh) retain adjoining houses in Islamabad as part of their service in the creation of the city of Islamabad. He served as the Vice-Prime Minister of Pakistan, and the commander in chief in the Prime Minister's absence. 
He and another person at the time were the two major founders of the capital city of Islamabad, forming it from a mostly barren area of land. In many different ways, he played an important part in the history of Pakistan.

Achievements and positions held
 An army surgeon by training, General Burki played a significant role in the development of the Army's medical facilities, especially the Armed Forces Institute of Pathology (Pakistan) in Rawalpindi and the Combined Military Hospital Network in Pakistan. 
 General Burki was the founding president of the College of Physicians and Surgeons of Pakistan in 1962. 'The General Wajid Ali Burki Medal' is awarded to one deserving graduating student each year by this college at its convocation each year.
 From 1962 to 1964, he was Pakistan's ambassador to the Scandinavian countries.

Awards and recognition
 Appointed a Member of the Most Excellent Order of the British Empire as Major, Indian Medical Service in recognition of distinguished services in the Middle East in the London Gazette 30 December 1941.
 He was promoted to a Commander of the Most Excellent Order of the British Empire on 15 November 1945 by King George VI in recognition of gallant and distinguished services in Burma during World War II.

References

1989 deaths
1900 births
Wajid Ali Khan
British Indian Army officers
Pakistani generals
Pakistani military doctors
Pashtun people
Alumni of the University of St Andrews
Government College University, Lahore alumni
Federal ministers of Pakistan
Ambassadors of Pakistan to Sweden
Pakistani Members of the Order of the British Empire
Commanders of the Order of the British Empire
Indian Medical Service officers